Seth is a surname. It is derived from the given name Seth. Notable people with the surname include:

Population Distribution 
According to the 1901 Census conducted by the British, the population distribution of Seth (subcaste of Khatris) are as follows:

Surname

Indian surname
A common Indian surname with variations Sheth, Sethi, all derived from Sanskrit Shreshthi.
Aftab Seth, former ambassador of India to Greece, Vietnam and Japan
Anjana Seth, Indian fashion designer
Ashok Seth, Indian interventional cardiologist 
 Gautam Seth, National Spokesperson Indian Youth Congress and Officer on Special Duty To Navjot Singh Sidhu
Anjana Seth, Indian fashion 
Bishanchander Seth, Indian politician
Chinubhai Chimanlal Seth (1901-1993), Indian industrialist and cotton textile mill owner 
Deeksha Seth (born 1990), Indian film actress and model
Divya Seth Shah, Indian film and television actress
Faiza Seth (born 1977), India-born American founder of Casa Forma/London design firm
Jagat Seths, a rich business, banking and money lender family 
James Seth (bishop) (1913-1975), Anglican bishop in Madagascar
Karnika Seth (born 1976), Indian lawyer and Women & Child protectionist
Kavita Seth (born 1970), Indian playback singer in Hindi cinema and live performer
Kiran Seth (born 1949), Indian academician
Lakshman Chandra Seth (born 1940), Indian politician from Tamluk, West Bengal
Leila Seth (born 1930), first woman judge on the Delhi High Court 
Mesrovb Jacob Seth (1871-1939), Indian historian and school master of Classical Armenian 
Mira Seth, Indian civil servant, diplomat, former Chairman of UNICEF
Philipa Seth (born 1994), Australian rules footballer
Pradeep Seth, Indian virologist, developer and self-tester of a purported vaccine for HIV
Raghunath Seth (1931–2014), Pandit, Indian exponent of Hindustani classical music
Rahul Seth (born 1977), Indian voice actor, dubbing artist, R&B-singer-songwriter
Rajiv Seth (born 1968), Indian former cricketer
Rohan Seth, co-founder of social audio app Clubhouse
Roshan Seth (born 1942), Indian actor
Samarth Seth (born 1999), Indian cricketer
Sanjay Seth (born 1961), Indian politician and businessman
Sanjay Kumar Seth (born 1957), Indian Judge and Chief justice of Madhya Pradesh High Court
Sanjeev Seth (born 1961), Indian TV actor
Shashi Kant Seth (born 1931), Indian Judge and Chief Justice of the Himachal Pradesh High Court
Shruti Seth (born 1977), Indian actress
Simeon Seth (11th-century) Byzantine scholar and Grand Chamberlain under Emperor Michael VII Doukas
Soumya Seth, Indian television actress
Suhel Seth (born 1963), co-founder and managing partner of the consultancy firm Counselage India
Sushma Seth (born 1936), Indian stage, film and television actress
Torgil von Seth (1895-1989), Swedish right-wing politician
Vatsal Seth (born 1980), Indian actor
Vikram Seth (born 1952), Indian writer
Waqar Ahmed Seth (born 1961), Pakistani judge and Chief Justice of Peshawar High Court
Rohit Seth (born 1980), Wall Street analyst

European surname
 Anil Seth, British professor of Cognitive and Computational Neuroscience
 Asha Seth (born 1939), Canadian politician and doctor
 Brian Seth Hurst, Chief Storyteller and President of StoryTech Immersive company
 Bruce Seth Green, American television director
 Cameron Seth (born 1994), Canadian squash player
 Catriona Seth (born 1964), British scholar of French literature
 David Seth Kotkin (born 1956), American magician
 David Seth-Smith (1875–1963), British zoologist, wildlife artist and broadcaster 
 Daniel Seth Loeb (born 1961), American investor, hedge fund manager, and philanthropist
 David Seth Doggett (1810–1880), American Bishop of the Methodist Episcopal Church
 Derek Seth-Smith (1920-1964), English first-class cricketer
 Henriett Seth F. (born 1980), Hungarian autistic savant poet
 Henry Seth, New York City Ballet dancer
 Iqbal Seth, Indian cricketer 
 James Seth (1860–1925), Scottish philosopher
 Joseph B. Seth (1845–1927), American politician and businessman
 Joshua Seth (born 1970), American actor
 Lancelot Seth Ward (1875-1929), English commander of the First Battalion of the King's African Rifles
 Leslie Seth-Smith, (1923-2007), English screenwriter and biographer 
 Martin Seth Kramer (born 1954), American-Israeli scholar of Islam and Arab politics
 Michael Seth Silverman, Canadian specialist in HIV/AIDS and infectious disease
 Mike Seth (born 1987), American soccer player 
 Oliver Seth (1915–1996), American judge
 Reidun Seth (born 1966), Norwegian football player and medallist
 Reva Seth, Canadian journalist and strategic communications consultant 
 Sunil Seth (born 1990), English-born Guyanese squash player 
 Vashti Seth, English founder of the UK's first peer-to-peer crowdfunding charity
 William Seth Agar (1815–1872), English Catholic canon
 William Seth Lampe (1906–1992), American journalist and former managing editor of the Detroit Times

See also
Sethi
Sethia (surname)
Sheth

References

Indian surnames
Surnames of Indian origin
Surnames of Hindustani origin
Hindu surnames
Punjabi-language surnames
Khatri clans
Khatri surnames